Lærke Winther Andersen (born 23 September 1975) is a Danish actress, best known for her role in Shake It All About (2001) and her recurring role in Those Who Kill.

References

Danish actresses
Living people
1975 births
Place of birth missing (living people)